Fernán Ferreiroa López (born 10 February 1995) is a Spanish professional footballer who plays as a midfielder, most recently for Ekstraklasa club Jagiellonia.

Club career
On 17 August 2019, López made his debut in the Azerbaijan Premier League for Gabala match against Sumgayit.

On 19 September 2020, López signed one-year contract with Polish club Jagiellonia Białystok.

On 8 October 2021, López returned to Gabala after leaving Jagiellonia Białystok during the summer of 2021, on a contract until the summer of 2022.

References

External links
 
 

1995 births
Living people
Spanish footballers
Association football midfielders
Segunda División B players
Azerbaijan Premier League players
Ekstraklasa players
Spanish expatriate footballers
Expatriate footballers in Azerbaijan
Spanish expatriate sportspeople in Azerbaijan
Expatriate footballers in Poland
Spanish expatriate sportspeople in Poland
Celta de Vigo B players
SD Compostela footballers
Barakaldo CF footballers
Gabala FC players
Jagiellonia Białystok players
Footballers from Nigrán